The 1905 Swarthmore Quakers football team was an American football team that represented Swarthmore College as an independent during the 1905 college football season. The team compiled an 8–1 record and outscored opponents by a total of 218 to 22. George H. Brooke was the head coach. The team's only loss was to undefeated Penn.

Schedule

References

Swarthmore
Swarthmore Garnet Tide football seasons
Swarthmore Quakers football